Lygropia xanthozonalis is a moth in the family Crambidae. It is found in Grenada.

References

Moths described in 1895
Lygropia